The flag of Perm Krai of Russia is a rectangular panel divided by a white cross, which is the St. George's Cross of the patron of Russia, charged with the coat of arms of the krai in the centre. The corners of the panel are divided into two colours: red at the top-left and bottom-right, and blue at the top-right and bottom-left. The flag was, until 2004, the flag of the Perm Oblast, which was merged with Komi-Permyak Autonomous Okrug to form Perm Krai.

The white symbolizes peace, virtue, and cleanliness of the thoughts of the Permian people. The blue symbolizes heat, beauty, and softness of human attitudes as well as the numerous lakes and rivers, riches of water resources, and the extensive bodies of water in the blast. The red symbolizes the courage, bravery, and fearlessness of the Permians. Altogether, they reflect the national colours of the Russian Federation.

The flag was adopted on 6 May 2003. The proportions are 2:3. Its design is similar to the flag of the Dominican Republic.

References
Flags of the World

Flag
Flags of the federal subjects of Russia
Perm Krai
Perm
Perm
2003 establishments in Russia

be:Герб Пермскага края